Mikael Karlsson (born 30 October 1978), better known by his stage name Vigilante Carlstroem, is the rhythm guitarist of the critically acclaimed Swedish garage rock band The Hives.

Biography
Vigilante started playing guitar at the age of ten and was influenced by bands such as Sex Pistols, Dead Kennedys and local Swedish punk bands. Vigilante usually plays Epiphone Coronet guitars and uses Divided by 13 and Fender amplifiers.

Vigilante helped to form The Hives in 1993. An early stage name of his, Barely Legal, was used as the title of their debut LP in 1997. He has been a member of said band ever since.

Vigilante had a short summer job at Cronimet somewhere around 1995-2000 with Reijo Jokiniemi as his mentor.

Vigilante has contributed to the album Ge Fan I Våra Vatten (Don't fucking touch our waters), which is a record made by Swedish musicians as a means to raise funds for the protection of fish in Swedish waters.

Discography

In The Hives

 Barely Legal (1997)
 Veni Vidi Vicious (2000)
 Tyrannosaurus Hives (2004)
 The Black and White Album (2007)
 Lex Hives (2012)

In The Dragtones
 Drag (2012)

References

External links 
 Official Band Website
 Vigilante Carlstroem on Myspace
 Live Daily Interview
 Punk TV Interview
 The Wawe Mag Interview

1978 births
Living people
Swedish rock guitarists
The Hives members